RK Nagar may refer to:

Places
 Ramakrishnanagar, a neighbourhood in Mysore, India
 Ramkrishna Nagar, Karimganj, a Township in Assam, India
 Radhakrishnan Nagar, an Assembly constituency in Chennai, India
 Radha Krishna Nagar, popularly known as Safilguda is a neighbourhood in Hyderabad, India
Ramakrishna Nagar, a small neighbourhood in Chennai, India.

Movies
 RK Nagar (film), a 2019 Tamil film

Institutions 
 Ramkrishna Nagar College, an educational institution in Karimganj, India